Trương Đình Dzu (10 November 1917 – ) was a South Vietnamese lawyer and politician who unsuccessfully ran as a candidate for the presidency in the 1967 elections against Nguyễn Văn Thiệu and his running mate Nguyễn Cao Kỳ, who were the leaders of the incumbent military junta. Dzu finished second in the election and won 17% of the vote on a platform of negotiating with the National Liberation Front for South Vietnam.  Politicians advocating coexistence with the communists were not allowed to register; Dzu remained silent on his policies until his candidacy was registered.

Dzu and other opposition candidates alleged electoral fraud after the poll, but he was arrested after the election on grounds of making illicit currency transactions and jailed by a military court for five years of hard labor. Due to international criticism, he was released after five months.

Before politics 
Dzu was born on 10 November 1917 in Qui Nhơn, Bình Định Province, in the central Vietnam. He was educated in Hanoi, and after graduating with a law degree, moved to the Mekong Delta's largest city Cần Thơ to practice in 1944, before relocating to Saigon in 1945. One of Dzu’s law partners was good friend Nguyễn Hữu Thọ, who later left Saigon and went into the countryside to become the nominal political leader of the National Liberation Front, as the Vietcong called itself. That friendship later prompted voters to think that Dzu's promises of negotiated peace between the government of South Vietnam and the communists was viable.

Dzu also worked in law with Trần Văn Khiêm, the younger brother of Madame Nhu, the First Lady and sister-in-law of bachelor President Ngô Đình Diệm. This benefited Dzu and Tho as the Ngos ran kangaroo courts that were their rubber stamps and Dzu's connections gave him an advantage and the ability to influence judges and law-enforcement agencies. During the Diệm era, Dzu visited the United States and joined the Rotary Club and rose to be the organisation's director for Southeast Asia, and was known for wearing his Rotary Club tie. Dzu had also earned negative attention when he once put up his wife as collateral for a loan.

1961 aborted election bid 
Dzu had declared his intention to stand as a candidate for the 1961 South Vietnamese presidential election against President Diem, but he was intimidated into withdrawing after being accused of having engaged in illegal fund transfers out of the country.

1967 election bid 
In early-1967, several Americans who were detained on currency-violation charges, something that was routine in South Vietnam, accused Dzu of offering to have them released if they gave him a commission of USD10,000 to bribe the judges. Dzu was put under investigation, but the probe was dropped to allow Dzu to participate in the 1967 presidential election campaign.

Under the political laws of the time, political activity that promoted negotiations with the communist Vietcong insurgents that were attempting to take over South Vietnam with the assistance of their ideological allies in North Vietnam, was forbidden. There had been previous instances where politicians that had advocated a ceasefire were disqualified from running.

As a little-known politician, he remained silent until his candidacy was approved before exhibiting his policies. After this was done, he campaigned with the dove as his emblem, urging negotiations. Dzu gained a reputation for being the most dynamic and eloquent of the 11 presidential candidates. He repeatedly assailed Thiệu and his deputy Ky in strident language, accusing them of using dirty tricks to hinder his campaign.

Dzu claimed that he had been meeting with the Buddhist activist leader Thích Trí Quang, but later denied this. He also claimed that the Vietcong called on communist sympathisers to vote for him, but later reneged on this. While others also advocated peace deals, Dzu was the most vigorous in disseminating his message, making competitors such as the aged Phan Khắc Sửu and Trần Văn Hương, who had briefly served as president and prime minister respectively under the junta's supervision in 1964–65, appear lethargic.

With 17% of the vote, he came second behind the ticket of General Nguyễn Văn Thiệu, hitherto the figurehead chief of state, and Air Marshal Nguyễn Cao Kỳ, the Prime Minister. Dzu's success caught observers by surprise. Two weeks before the poll, a study by US Embassy officials privately estimated that he would only get around 4% of the vote and come fifth on the popular vote.

Of the 44 provinces, Dzu came first in 5 provinces, all of which were under the control of communist guerrillas, and he placed second in 26 provinces behind the Thiệu–Kỳ ticket. These provinces were also known for being infested with communists. This led to claims the communists had voted for him and forced the population to do so as well. Dzu rebutted this by pointing out that by such logic, the communists had supported Thiệu and were therefore aligned with him.

In the accompanying senate election, voters had to choose six out of the 48 candidate groupings, and the six most popular tickets of ten nominees would be elected to the 60-member upper house. Dzu endorsed five tickets, but none were successful.

Along with two other failed presidential candidates, Sửu and Hoàng Cơ Bình, Dzu held a media conference accusing Thiệu and Kỳ of engaging in election fraud. Kỳ had not hidden his distaste for democracy or his opponents during the campaign and had "described the civilian candidates as 'ordure' [dirt, filth, excrement], 'traitors', and 'destroyers of the national interest'". Kỳ went on to say that if his opponents continued to attack him, he would cancel the poll. Dzu and seven other civilian tickets filed formal complaints against the military for campaign irregularities. American officials, in line with their support for Thiệu and Kỳ, dismissed the protests as sour grapes, but a committee from the Constituent Assembly later resolved 16–2 to void the election results due to "a pattern of fraud". The finding had no effect as Thiệu and Kỳ made a series of arrests and other crackdowns against any civilian dissent.

After the election, Dzu claimed to be leader of the opposition to Thiệu and Kỳ. Dzu's performance was regarded to be a sign of the public discontent with the military rule of the Army of the Republic of Vietnam officers, rather than an endorsement of his policies. Nevertheless, Thiệu was embarrassed by the results and had him arrested for illicit currency transactions. Dzu was accused of illegally opening a bank account in San Francisco and was put under police surveillance.

Dzu was arrested and brought before a Special Military Court on 26 July 1968 and sentenced to five years of hard labour, but due to public pressure in South Vietnam and abroad, he was released after only five months.

After the fall of Saigon in April 1975, accused of contacts with American officials and the Central Intelligence Agency, Dzu was sent to a re-education camp by the new communist government. He is believed to have died in the mid-1980s. Dzu's son, David Truong, who was living in the United States since the mid-1960s, was in 1978 convicted of espionage for the Vietnamese government.

Notes

References 
 
 
 

1917 births
1991 deaths
South Vietnamese politicians
Vietnamese politicians
South Vietnamese prisoners and detainees
South Vietnamese dissidents
Prisoners and detainees of Vietnam